The 2000 Belgian Grand Prix (formally, the LVIII Foster's Belgian Grand Prix) was a Formula One motor race held on 27 August 2000 at the Circuit de Spa-Francorchamps, Francorchamps, Wallonia, Belgium with a crowd of 83,000 attendees observing. It was the 13th race of the 2000 Formula One World Championship, and the 58th Belgian Grand Prix. McLaren driver Mika Häkkinen won the 44-lap race from pole position. Michael Schumacher finished second in a Ferrari, and Williams driver Ralf Schumacher was third.

Häkkinen went into the event as the World Drivers' Championship leader with his team McLaren leading the World Constructors' Championship. The race began behind the safety car due to overnight rainfall making the track wet and reducing visibility. When the safety car returned to the pit lane Häkkinen built a significant lead over Jarno Trulli. As the track dried and other drivers made pit stops, Häkkinen maintained his lead until a lap-13 spin gave Michael Schumacher the lead for most of the remainder of the race. By the 34th lap Schumacher's tyres began to degrade; he drove off the racing line to cool them, which allowed Häkkinen to close the gap. On lap 41 Häkkinen overtook Michael Schumacher for the lead while lapping BAR driver Ricardo Zonta and maintaining the lead to win. Although Rubens Barrichello set the fastest lap time in the other Ferrari, he was hampered by a poor qualifying performance and retired with a fuel-pressure problem thirteen laps from the finish.

Häkkinen's victory extended his lead in the World Drivers' Championship to six points over Michael Schumacher, with Coulthard a further seven points behind. Barrichello's retirement dropped him to twenty-five points behind Häkkinen. In the World Constructors' Championship, McLaren extended their lead to eight points over Ferrari with four races remaining in the season.

Background
The 2000 Belgian Grand Prix was the 13th of the 17 races in the 2000 Formula One World Championship and took place at the  Circuit de Spa-Francorchamps in Francorchamps, Wallonia, Belgium on 27 August 2000. Sole tyre supplier Bridgestone brought the soft and medium dry compounds ad well as the hard and soft wet-weather compounds to the event; the intermediate had a curvy pattern and the full wet was suited for monsoon conditions that are frequently observed at the track. The wet-weather tyres were introduced for the race in response to prospective new tyre supplier Michelin beginning their tyre-development program during the year, resulting in Bridgestone increasing their development rate to research advances.

Schumacher's teammate Rubens Barrichello was fourth with 49 points, and Benetton's Giancarlo Fisichella was fifth with 18. In the World Constructors' Championship McLaren led with 112 points, one point ahead of second-placed Ferrari. Williams were third with 24 points, while Benetton (18 points) and Jordan (12) were fourth and fifth respectively.

After the race in Hungary, five teams conducted mid-season testing at the Silverstone Circuit from 15 to 17 August. McLaren test driver Olivier Panis was fastest on the first day, ahead of Jordan's Heinz-Harald Frentzen. Williams test driver Bruno Junqueira's car had a water leak, resulting in repairs which limited his team's testing time. Panis remained the fastest on the second day. Jos Verstappen's Arrows car had a sensor failure, limiting his team's testing time; the car's floor had to be removed to install a new sensor. Panis was again fastest on the final day of testing. Ferrari opted to test the suspension and tyres of Michael Schumacher's car at the Fiorano Circuit. Schumacher later moved to the Mugello Circuit, with Barrichello conducting engine and setup tests, and Ferrari test driver Luca Badoer remained at Fiorano for development work on new car components. Prost opted to test at the Autodromo Nazionale Monza on 17–18 August with driver Jean Alesi. Benetton conducted a five-day, one-car test at the Danielson Circuit, with test driver Mark Webber on aerodynamic development for the first four days and Alexander Wurz concentrating on practice starts the last day.

In September 1999 the Fédération Internationale de l'Automobile (FIA) released a provisional calendar for the 2000 season, dropping the Circuit de Spa-Francorchamps from the Formula One World Championship due to Belgian tobacco-advertising laws which threatened to cancel the race; several teams had tobacco sponsorship. The FIA had the revived Dutch Grand Prix at the Circuit Park Zandvoort and the Portuguese Grand Prix at the Autódromo do Estoril as alternatives if the Belgian Grand Prix was cancelled. The dispute was resolved when the Belgian government exempted the race from the advertising law, and it was reinstated at the FIA World Motor Sport Council meeting in Paris on 6 October.

The Grand Prix was contested by eleven teams (each represented by a different constructor) with two drivers each and there were no changes from the season entry list. Ferrari arrived at the circuit with a lighter, more-powerful version of its Tipo 049 V10 engine for Saturday's qualifying session, returning to the development power plant used at the Hungarian Grand Prix. They also had a revised aerodynamic package. Williams brought new exhausts and an extractor profile as the remaining teams limited themselves to introducing minor refinements to their cars.

Practice

There were four practice sessions preceding Sunday's race, two one-hour sessions Friday and two 45-minute sessions on Saturday. Conditions were dry for the Friday morning and afternoon practice sessions. A thick layer of dust was progressively lifted from the racing surface. Coulthard set the first session's fastest time with a lap of 1 minute, 53.398 seconds, eight-tenths of a second quicker than Michael Schumacher. Häkkinen had the third-fastest time, with Jarno Trulli for Jordan, Barrichello and BAR's Jacques Villeneuve in the next three positions. The two Benetton drivers were seventh and eighth (with Wurz ahead of Fisichella), and the Williams cars of Ralf Schumacher and Button completed the top ten. Alesi's Prost had a fuel-pressure problem which prevented him from completing a timed lap, and he was the slowest overall. Button almost made contact with the tyre wall at La Source and avoided losing control of the rear of his car under braking entering the Bus Stop chicane. Ferrari opted to limit their running during the session to limit their tyre usage.

In the second practice session, due to a slow rear puncture Coulthard's first-session lap was still the fastest; Häkkinen had the second-fastest time. Jaguar driver Johnny Herbert changed his car's balance, improving its performance and finishing third-fastest. Villeneuve moved into fourth after changes to his car's setup; Michael Schumacher slipped to fifth, and Wurz finished sixth. Verstappen was seventh-fastest, ahead of Fisichella, Barrichello and Trulli in positions eight through ten.

The weather remained dry for the Saturday-morning practice sessions. Häkkinen set the fastest lap of the third session at 1 minute, 51.043 seconds, quicker than his best on Friday and ahead of Frentzen, Trulli and Ralf Schumacher. Coulthard, who had an engine problem early in the session, was fifth-fastest (ahead of Button and Michael Schumacher). Alesi, Villeneuve and Sauber driver Nick Heidfeld rounded out the top ten. During the final practice session Häkkinen could not improve his time, although he remained the fastest. Button, much happier with his car's handling, set the second-fastest time. The Jordan drivers were third and fourth, with Trulli ahead of Frentzen. Ralf Schumacher and Coulthard completed the top six. Of the slower drivers, Marc Gené had an anxious moment when his Minardi car shed its engine cover but was able to return to his garage.

Qualifying
Saturday afternoon's one hour qualifying session each driver was limited to twelve laps, with the starting order decided by their fastest laps. During this session the 107% rule was in effect, requiring each driver to remain within 107 per cent of the fastest lap time to qualify for the race. The session was held in dry and sunny weather. Häkkinen was unhindered by slower traffic, clinched his fifth pole position of the season, his third at the circuit and the 26th of his career with a time of 1 minute, 50.646 seconds; although he was optimistic about his race prospects, he was concerned about the start. Häkkinen was joined in the front row of the grid by Trulli, who equalled his best qualifying performance of the season (at the ). Trulli was also optimistic about his chances because of the Jordan team's strong record at the circuit. Button had a new qualifying engine installed in the rear of his vehicle which was the same as his teammate's one. He opted to fine-tune his setup to qualify third in his best-qualifying position of the season despite a power steering issue. He said he was happy with his starting position. Michael Schumacher, who had been impeded by traffic and had his quickest time slowed by a yellow flag for an incident, secured fourth position, nine-tenths of a second behind Häkkinen, setting a lap  which demoted Häkkinen's teammate Coulthard into fifth. Coulthard, who had problems with grip, believed that he could have had a faster lap time due to slower cars impeding his final two runs and a requirement to slow for the Bus Stop chicane following an incident.

Ralf Schumacher secured sixth position after being caught in traffic during his final run, keeping the Williams driver from a quicker lap time. Villeneuve, in seventh, reported oversteering, and was upset he could not through Eau Rouge corner at high speed. Frentzen qualified eighth; his best lap time was disqualified after Coulthard blocked him at the Bus Stop chicane, which caused Frentzen to run onto the grass. He retaliated by slowing Coulthard into La Source corner at the start of his following lap. Herbert and Barrichello were ninth and tenth; Barrichello spun at the chicane during his third run after locking his brakes. Fisichella, eleventh, missed the top ten by three-tenths of a second on his only quick run of the session. Herbert's teammate, Eddie Irvine, qualified twelfth with tyre-grip problems. He was ahead of Zonta in the slower of the two BARs (which lost a half-second through Eau Rouge), Heidfeld in the faster Prost, Sauber's Pedro Diniz and Arrows driver Pedro de la Rosa. Alesi qualified 17th, despite spinning at the Bus Stop chicane and triggering a yellow flag, which prevented several drivers from lapping quicker. Salo qualified 18th due to car issues caused by a lack of grip, ahead of Wurz (who had engine problems that caused smoke to billow from it on the entry to the Bus Stop chicane on his out-lap and shared the spare Benetton monocoque with Fisichella). Verstappen, after a braking error at La Source, and the two Minardi drivers of Gené and Mazzacane qualified at the back of the grid, in positions 20 to 22.

Qualifying classification

Warm-up

The drivers took the track at 09:30 Central European Summer Time (UTC+2) for a 30-minute warm-up in wet weather, with lap times 13 seconds slower than the previous days' practice and qualifying sessions. Heavy rain fell early in the morning from 5:00 am and it increased incrementally before stopping; a rising mist formed low on the track by dawn. Drivers used full-wet tyres on the slippery racing surface and later intermediate rain tyres when the track began drying out. Häkkinen set the fastest lap time of the session at 2:03.392. Michael Schumacher was the second-fastest driver; Button was third, two-thousands of a second slower than Schumacher. Barrichello was fourth and Coulthard completed the five fastest drivers.

After spinning sideways because one of his rear wheels touched a damp white line, Fisichella struck the tyre barriers at Stavelot corner with enough force to launch him into the air. He landed upside-down on the roll-hoop of the vehicle; the session was suspended for approximately 20 minutes while marshals cleared the track of debris and repaired the wall. Fisichella sustained a bruised left knee, and was forced to start the race with his team's spare car. Jacques Villeneuve damaged his car's rear end in a crash against the tyre barrier at Les Fagnes turn later in the session, but was able to continue.

Race

The rain had stopped by the time of the race's start but there was standing water on the track, causing heavy spray and impairing visibility, which meant that the race would start behind the safety car following consultation between the drivers and FIA race director Charlie Whiting on the track's condition; all cars except Pedro Diniz' had wet tyres. The intermediate and full wet tyres were reported to be suitable for short stints, thus the normal wet or grooved tyres were the tyre selection for the event. Every driver had a car setup with compromises made for wet-weather conditions and additions to downforce as well as setup changes for dry weather racing.

Instead of a two-by-two standing start, the race began with an American-style single file rolling start without a formation lap. During the safety car period, Diniz spun off; he was passed by Pedro de la Rosa, who received a ten-second stop-go penalty which he served on lap 13. The safety car entered the pit lane after one lap, and the cars were allowed to overtake after crossing the start-finish line. Häkkinen maintained his lead going into the first corner, followed by Trulli, Button, Michael Schumacher and Coulthard. Barrichello overtook Herbert for ninth place at the first turn. At the end of the first racing lap, Diniz dropped to the rear of the field. De la Rosa lost 16th position on lap three after running wide at turn 18, losing two places to Alesi and Verstappen.

Häkkinen began to pull away from Trulli. Attention switched to Button, who tried to pass Trulli, whom he felt was baulking him and noticed Michael Schumacher approaching him, On the fourth lap Button slipstreamed Trulli on the approach to the Bus Stop chicane, but he ran wide and left the inside open for Michael Schumacher to take third position. On that lap, Alesi was the first driver to pit for dry tyres after informing his team over the radio of his intent to do so when the track began to dry. By the beginning of the fifth lap Häkkinen increased his lead over Trulli to 9.1 seconds, ahead of Michael Schumacher, Button and Coulthard. Schumacher then took second place from Trulli at La Source. Button was anxious to recover from his error and attempted to follow Schumacher down the inside at the same corner, but Button and Trulli collided. Trulli was sent into a spin, becoming the first retirement of the race after he stalled the engine. Button lost two positions to Coulthard and Ralf Schumacher approaching Eau Rouge turn and he spent the following few laps checking if his car was undamaged; he sustained front wing and minor steering damage.

As the dry line continued to appear on the circuit, Alesi's pace on the dry tyres saw him lap faster than the race leaders and encouraged other teams to bring their drivers into the pit lane for dry tyres. Michael and Ralf Schumacher were the first leaders to pit for dry tyres on lap six. Häkkinen made a pit stop from the lead on lap seven, followed by Button, and re-emerged ahead of Coulthard to retain the lead. Coulthard was required to remain on the circuit on deteriorating wet-weather compound tyres while his team tended to his teammate Häkkinen. He made his pit stop on the eighth lap, re-emerging in ninth position. All drivers made pit stops by the end of lap nine. The race order at the time was Häkkinen, Michael Schumacher, Ralf Schumacher, Alesi, Button, and Villeneuve. During that lap Barrichello overtook Frentzen for seventh, whilst Verstappen and Fisichella collided after Verstappen tried to pass the slowing Benetton at the Bus Stop chicane. Verstappen sustained damage to his front wing, and Fisichella later retired with an electrical problem that was caused by a loss of power.

By the beginning of lap 13, Michael Schumacher closed the gap from Häkkinen to about 4.6 seconds after setting four consecutive fastest laps. Later in the lap, one of Häkkinen's wheels touched a damp kerb at Stavelot corner and he was sent spinning sideways for several hundred yards at high-speed into the grass; Michael Schumacher took the lead, as a consequence of Häkkinen's error that lost the McLaren driver ten seconds. Nick Heidfeld was the race's third retirement when his car developed an engine failure caused by a broken gearbox that affected the common oil circuit. Alesi, the first front-runner to make a scheduled pit stop on lap 18, rejoined in tenth. During the next two laps Salo passed Irvine for twelfth, whilst Barrichello made a pit stop from sixth position and came out in eleventh.

By lap 21, Michael Schumacher had increased his lead over Häkkinen to eleven-and-a-half seconds. Ralf Schumacher, ten seconds behind Häkkinen, led teammate Button by six seconds. Michael Schumacher made a pit stop on that lap that took 11.1 seconds to complete, emerging in third position. On lap 23 Barrichello passed Herbert for ninth position, and during the next two laps Villeneuve and Ralf Schumacher made pit stops. Button made a pit stop from fourth position on lap 26. Häkkinen entered the pit lane one lap later after holding five more laps of fuel than Michael Schumacher; Häkkinen was told by his team (on pit boards) to speed up to gain on Michael Schumacher, who had a heavier fuel load. Button dropped to eighth position, and Häkkinen came out behind Michael Schumacher. Frentzen and Coulthard made their pit stops together on lap 28, with Coulthard emerging ahead of Frentzen. On that lap, Barrichello passed Alesi for sixth position.

Barrichello, setting the fastest lap of the race (1 minute, 53.803 seconds on lap 30), had consecutive fastest laps before making his second pit stop on lap 31. However, his car's fuel pressure dropped which caused him to run out of fuel and he was pushed by marshals into the pit lane. Barrichello and Alesi (who had a similar problem caused by a fractured fuel system) retired, and Button inherited fourth place. Salo was the final scheduled driver to make a pit stop, on lap 33. At the end of lap 34, after all scheduled pit stops, the running order was Michael Schumacher, Häkkinen, Ralf Schumacher, Button, Coulthard, and Frentzen. During that lap Michael Schumacher's tyres began to degrade, and he ran off the racing line to cool them by driving through water; Häkkinen gradually closed the gap, due to his McLaren having a straightline speed advantage on the straights, and he began duelling Michael Schumacher for the race lead as the track had become completely dry.  Coulthard, fifth, passed Button on the outside entering Les Combes corner for fourth position on lap 37.

Häkkinen tried to pass Michael Schumacher on the inside for the lead on the 40th lap on the approach to Les Combes turn, (after drafting behind him on the straightaway), but Schumacher blocked him to defend late in the attempt to hold onto his position. The drivers made contact, with Häkkinen receiving minor damage to his front wing from contact with Schumacher's right-rear wheel and forced to slow. During the following lap, Häkkinen was quicker through Eau Rouge turn and drew closer to Michael Schumacher. While both competitors were lapping the slower car of Zonta who was driving on the centre of the circuit, Häkkinen steered right onto a damp patch to pass Schumacher for the lead after Schumacher turned left believing that there was inadequate space on the right. Zonta had slowed and Häkkinen turned left with the extra momentum gained from the slipstream from both Schumacher and Zonta to be ahead into the right-hand Les Combes corner.

Michael Schumacher finished second, 1.1 seconds behind Häkkinen and ahead of Ralf Schumacher in third after Schumacher became concerned about an engine failure in the final six laps (a throttle fault almost caused him to retire from the race). Coulthard, after being kept on the circuit longer than teammate Häkkinen before his pit stop for the dry compound tyres, was fourth. Button followed in fifth position and Frentzen completed the points scorers in sixth. Villeneuve (who reported race-long handling issues), Herbert, Salo, Irvine and Diniz filled the next five positions. Zonta, Wurz, Gené and Verstappen finished a lap behind the leader, and de la Rosa and Mazzacane were the final finishers. 17 of the 22 starters finished the Grand Prix.

After the race
The top three drivers appeared on the podium to collect their trophies and at a later press conference. Häkkinen was delighted with his victory, saying: "This was an incredible win. It was a very difficult and unusual situation including my spin which of course was not planned. The kerbs here are very slippery and once you go over one there is not much you can do. I was lucky to keep going and I was able to chase Michael. But the car got better and better." The driver added that he wanted to review his overtaking manoeuvre to see if Michael Schumacher performed an illegal move. Schumacher said that despite improvements to his car, he was unable to match Häkkinen's overall pace. He added that he experienced no problems running off-line to cool his tyres, and was happy to run behind slower cars for straight-line speed assistance during the race's closing stages.

Ralf Schumacher said, "I'm more than happy; we have been strong here the whole weekend and my car behaved perfectly. I had a little moment of worry about six laps from the end when the throttle didn't seem to pick up properly and I thought the engine was going to stop, but it came back and all was well." Schumacher added that his team was confident of securing third in the Constructors' Championship; although he could not match Häkkinen's pace, he praised the team for his car's set-up. Coulthard was disappointed with his fourth-place finish, and thought his team's decision to call him into the pit lane after his competitors cost him the victory; however, he remained confident about his championship chances. Button was also disappointed to finish fifth, stating: "It was a bad race for me, if not the worst. The car was working well at the start, but when I tried to pass Jarno I went in a bit late." Trulli refused to criticise Button after the race, believing that Button made a mistake. Fisichella and Verstappen felt similarly about their lap-nine collision, with Fisichella saying that he "felt sorry" for Verstappen and describing his weekend as "disastrous". Verstappen said that he struggled with his car's balance, which resulted in oversteer. He was "happy to go home" because "it's not been a good weekend". Frentzen said that although he was happy to score points, he had hoped for a better finish.

The media focused on Häkkinen overtaking Michael Schumacher for the lead on lap 41. After the race, Häkkinen went to Schumacher in parc fermé and told him not to make such a manoeuvre with at high speed that he deemed "a life and death situation" and not to make a move like that again. Zonta later said that although he was unaware of Häkkinen's presence, he saw Schumacher in his mirrors. Schumacher would go on to be complimentary of the manoeuvre. Derick Allsop of The Independent described the impact the move might have on Häkkinen's career, commenting: "Perhaps, he [Mika Häkkinen] will be recognised as a driver worthy of a place in the pantheon of the sport's heroes." McLaren team principal Ron Dennis said: "His overtaking manoeuvre I'm sure will go down as one of the greatest in Formula One history." In February 2001, Häkkinen's move was chosen by more than 60 Formula One historians as the MasterCard Priceless Moment of the 2000 F1 season.

The use of a safety car to start the race had a mixed response within the sport. Coulthard agreed with the FIA's decision, saying: "I know there will be a debate over it but the fact is I was asked beforehand and I said that, based on the previous years we've had here, the safest thing is to have a safety-car start." He added that although the safety-car start eliminated overtaking, it also prevented a major accident. Ralf Schumacher also agreed with the decision to start under safety-car conditions. ITV-F1 commentator and former driver Martin Brundle felt that the track was not wet enough for a safety car. Journalist Nigel Roebuck said that the length of time under safety-car conditions was inadequate, and raised the possibility of abandoning standing starts. Whiting consulted Coulthard, the drivers' representative, before making his decision.

After the race, Häkkinen remained in the World Drivers' Championship lead with 74 points. Michael Schumacher was second with 68 points, seven points ahead of Coulthard and nineteen ahead of Barrichello. Ralf Schumacher passed Fisichella for fifth place with 20 points, and Frentzen moved ahead of teammate Trulli and Salo. In the World Constructors' Championship, McLaren maintained their lead with 125 points and Ferrari remained in second with 117 points. Williams increased their lead over Benetton to twelve points, and Jordan remained fifth with 13 points. Given Häkkinen's increased lead, Michael Schumacher acknowledged that his team lacked speed against McLaren in the season's four remaining races but remained confident of winning the world championship.

Race classification
Drivers who scored championship points are denoted in bold.

Championship standings after the race

Drivers' Championship standings

Constructors' Championship standings

 Note: Only the top five positions are included for both sets of standings.

References

Belgian Grand Prix
Belgian Grand Prix
Grand Prix
August 2000 sports events in Europe